Delias nieuwenhuisi is a butterfly in the family Pieridae. It was described by Henricus Jacobus Gerardus van Mastrigt in 1990. It is endemic to New Guinea.

The wingspan is about 38 mm. Adults are similar to Delias leucias, but may be distinguished by the considerably enlarged cream patch on the underside of the hindwings.

Subspecies
Delias nieuwenhuisi nieuwenhuisi (Telefomin, Papua New Guinea)
Delias nieuwenhuisi nose van Mastrigt, 2003 (Enga Province, Papua New Guinea)
Delias nieuwenhuisi poponga van Mastrigt, 1990 (Star Mountains, West Irian)

References

External links
Delias at Markku Savela's Lepidoptera and Some Other Life Forms

nieuwenhuisi
Butterflies described in 1990
Endemic fauna of New Guinea